Philip Hugh Jones (born 13 May 1951) was Archdeacon of Lewes & Hastings from 2005 to 2014 and, after renaming, Archdeacon of Hastings from 2014 to 2015.

Jones was educated at The Leys School and  Chichester Theological College. He was a solicitor from 1975 to 1992. He was ordained deacon in 1994, and priest in 1995. After a curacy in Horsham he was Vicar of Southwater from 1997 to 2005.

References

Archdeacons of Lewes & Hastings

People educated at The Leys School
Alumni of Chichester Theological College

1951 births

Living people

People from Southwater